Verkhnyaya Toyda is a rural locality (a selo) and the administrative center of Verkhnetoydenskoye Rural Settlement, Anninsky District, Voronezh Oblast, Russia. The population was 836 as of 2010. There are 12 streets.

Geography 
Verkhnyaya Toyda is located 12 km southwest of Anna (the district's administrative centre) by road. Levashovka is the nearest rural locality.

References 

Rural localities in Anninsky District